Mont Orohena is a mountain located in the South Pacific, on the island of Tahiti. Mont Orohena is an extinct volcano.

See also
List of Ultras of Oceania

References

Orohena
Orohena
Orohena